Diaphragmatic hernia is a defect or hole in the diaphragm that allows the abdominal contents to move into the chest cavity. Treatment is usually surgical.

Types
 Congenital diaphragmatic hernia
 Morgagni's hernia
 Bochdalek hernia
 Hiatal hernia
 Iatrogenic diaphragmatic hernia
 Traumatic diaphragmatic hernia

Signs and symptoms
A scaphoid abdomen (sucked inwards) may be the presenting symptom in a newborn.

Diagnosis

Diagnosis can be made by either CT or X-ray.

Treatment
Treatment for a diaphragmatic hernia usually involves surgery, with acute injuries often repaired with monofilament permanent sutures.

Other animals 
Peritoneopericardial diaphragmatic hernia is a type of hernia more common in other mammals. This is usually treated with surgery.

References

Bibliography

External links 

Diaphragmatic hernias